Forks Township, Pennsylvania may refer to:
Forks Township, Northampton County, Pennsylvania
Forks Township, Sullivan County, Pennsylvania

Pennsylvania township disambiguation pages